"Stand Up" is a song written and originally recorded in 1996 by the American house music studio group Love Tribe, featuring American dance songstress Latanza Waters. The original version, notable for using the keyboard sampling from Machine's 1979 disco hit "There But for the Grace of God Go I", became their only chart-topper on Billboard's Dance Club Songs chart, reaching number one on August 31, 1996 for a one-week stay, as well as a number 89 placement on the Hot 100 chart in January 1997.
 It reached No. 23 on the UK Singles Chart in July that same year.

1996 release

Original mixes
"Stand Up (Narcotic Mix)"
"Stand Up (Dub-Alicious)"
"Stand Up (Tribe Vibe)"
"Stand Up (Wildchild Renagade Dub)"
"Stand Up (Anthemlicious Mix)"
"Stand Up (Love and Happiness Mix)"
"Stand Up (Narcotic Dub)"
"Stand Up (Slam Dub)"

US mixes 
 "Stand Up (Narcotic Edit)" - 3:12  
 "Stand Up (Alcatraz Robs the Edit)" - 3:52  
 "Stand Up (Narcotic Mix)" - 8:39  
 "Stand Up (Alcatraz Robs the Bank)" - 8:56  
 "Stand Up (Anthemlicious Mix)" - 7:56

Thunderpuss version

In 2001, Canadian/American duo Thunderpuss released their version of "Stand Up" which again featured Waters on vocals. Their version peaked at number five on Billboard's Dance Club Songs chart that same year.

Track listing
 "Stand Up (E-Smoove Radio Edit)" - 3:23  
 "Stand Up (Thunderpuss Radio Edit)" - 3:58  
 "Stand Up (Thunderpuss Club Mix)" - 8:14

Dirty Werk version

In 2018, American duo Dirty Werk released an electro dance version of "Stand Up" which became their first number one on the Billboard Dance Club Songs chart on September 22, 2018.

Track listing

Stand Up (download mixes)
"Stand Up (Nick Rockwell Extended Remix)"
"Stand Up (Nick Rockwell Radio Mix)"
"Stand Up (Scotty Boy & Luca Debonaire Extended Remix)"
"Stand Up (Scotty Boy & Luca Debonaire Radio Edit)"
"Stand Up (Lodato And Joseph Duveen Extended Remix)"
"Stand Up (Freshcobar And Lavelle Dupree Extended Remix)"
"Stand Up (Freshcobar & Lavelle Dupree Extended Remix)"
"Stand Up (Freshcobar & Lavelle Dupree Radio Edit)"
"Stand Up (Lodato & Joseph Duveen Extended Remix)"
"Stand Up (Lodato & Joseph Duveen Radio Edit)"

References

External links
Official Dirty Werk Audio on YouTube

1996 songs
1996 singles
2001 singles
2018 singles
Electronic songs
House music songs